This is a list of years in Czechoslovakia. See also the History of Czechoslovakia.  For only articles about years in Czechoslovakia that have been written, see :Category:Years in Czechoslovakia.

First Czechoslovak Republic

Second Czechoslovak Republic

Third Czechoslovak Republic

Czechoslovak Socialist Republic

 
Czechoslovakia